Zīj as-Sindhind (Zīj as‐Sindhind al‐kabīr, lit. "Great astronomical tables of the Sindhind"; from Sanskrit siddhānta, "system" or "treatise") is a work of zij (astronomical handbook with tables used to calculate celestial positions) brought in the early 770s AD to the court of Caliph al-Mansur in Baghdad from India. Al-Mansur requested an Arabic translation of this work from the Sanskrit. The 8th-century astronomer and translator Muhammad al-Fazari is known to have contributed to this translation. In his book Ṭabaqāt al-ʼUmam (Categories of Nations), Said al-Andalusi informs that others who worked on it include al-Baghdadi and al-Khwarizmi. He adds that its meaning is "ad-dahr ad-dahir" (infinite time or cyclic time).

Content 

This is the first of many Arabic zijs based on the Indian astronomical methods known as the Sindhind. The work contains tables for the movements of the sun, the moon and the five planets known at the time. It consists of approximately 37 chapters on calendar and astronomical calculations and 116 tables with calendar, astronomical and astrological data, as well as a table of sine values. 

As described by Said al-Andalusi, as-Sindhind divides time into cyclic periods of creation and destruction which are called Kalpa (aeon).

Notes

Sources
 
  (PDF version)

Astronomical works of the medieval Islamic world
History of astronomy
Astronomy in India
Astronomical tables